McCulley is a surname. Notable people with the surname include:

Bob McCulley (1914–1993), Canadian professional ice hockey right winger
Bobby McCulley (born 1952), Scottish footballer
Danielle McCulley (born 1975), former professional basketball player
Johnston McCulley (1883–1958), author and creator of the character Zorro
Michael J. McCulley (born 1943), former NASA astronaut and first submariner in space
Paul McCulley (born 1957), managing director at PIMCO
Pete McCulley (1931–1992), head coach of the San Francisco 49ers in the 1978 season
Ed McCulley (born 1969), Entrepreneur

See also
McCulley Township, Boyd County, Nebraska, United States
McCulley Township, Emmons County, North Dakota, a former U.S. township
McAlley
McAuley (disambiguation)
McCauley (disambiguation)
McCully